Yang Quanxi is a Chinese powerlifter. He won the bronze medal at the Men's 59 kg event at the 2016 Summer Paralympics, with 176 kilograms.

References

External links
 

Year of birth missing (living people)
Living people
Chinese powerlifters
Male powerlifters
Paralympic powerlifters of China
Paralympic bronze medalists for China
Paralympic medalists in powerlifting
Powerlifters at the 2016 Summer Paralympics
Medalists at the 2016 Summer Paralympics
People from Heze
21st-century Chinese people